The Netherlands cricket team were scheduled to tour Namibia in March and April 2020, to play four Twenty20 Internationals (T20Is) and two One Day Internationals (ODIs) at the Wanderers Cricket Ground in Windhoek. However, on 13 March 2020, the tour was cancelled due to the COVID-19 pandemic. The tour is now scheduled to take place in 2020–21, subject to COVID-19 restrictions.

Squads

T20I series

1st T20I

2nd T20I

3rd T20I

4th T20I

ODI series

1st ODI

2nd ODI

References

External links
 Series home at ESPN Cricinfo

2020 in Dutch cricket
2020 in Namibian cricket
International cricket competitions in 2019–20
Namibia
Cricket events postponed due to the COVID-19 pandemic